Novopokrovskoye is a rural locality (a selo) in Mrakovsky Selsoviet, Kugarchinsky District, Bashkortostan, Russia. The population was 145 as of 2010. There is 1 street.

Geography 
Novopokrovskoye is located 10 km southwest of Mrakovo (the district's administrative centre) by road. Yakshimbetovo is the nearest rural locality.

References 

Rural localities in Kugarchinsky District